Coulton is a surname. Notable people with the surname include:

Charles Coulton, English footballer
G. G. Coulton, (1858–1947) British medievalist
Jonathan Coulton (b. 1970), folk-rock singer, songwriter
Mark Coulton (b. 1958), Australian politician
James Coulton, a pseudonym for author Joseph Hansen

See also
Coulton, North Yorkshire, a village in England
Coulton Waugh, longtime artist on the famous Dickie Dare comic strip.
 Colton (disambiguation)